Type 23 may refer to:
 Bristol Type 23 Badger, a British fighter aircraft
 Nieuport Type 23, a French fighter aircraft
 Norinco Type 23-1 and Type 23-2, the Chinese versions of the Soviet autocannon Nudelman-Rikhter NR-23
 Peugeot Type 23, motor vehicle by the French auto-maker Peugeot
 Type 23 frigate, a Royal Navy frigate class
 Type 23 pillbox, a British WW II defence structure
 Type 23 torpedo boat, a class of torpedo boat built for the German Navy